Long Shin Estate is a public housing estate in Au Tau, Yuen Long, New Territories, Hong Kong, near TWGHs C.Y. Ma Memorial College and Yuen Long Government Primary School. It consists of three residential blocks completed in 2017.

Houses

Politics
Long Shin Estate is located in Shap Pat Heung East constituency of the Yuen Long District Council. It was formerly represented by Lee Chun-wai, who was elected in the 2019 elections until July 2021.

See also

Public housing estates in Yuen Long

References

Yuen Long
Public housing estates in Hong Kong
Residential buildings completed in 2017